Abu'l-Hasan Ali ibn Muhammad al-Maghribi was a high-ranking official of the Abbasid Caliphate in the early 10th century. Of Persian origin, he became head of the diwan al-maghrib, the "Bureau of the West", whence his family acquired the nisbah of "al-Maghribi". Beginning with Abu'l-Hasan Ali, the Banu'l-Maghribi would form a dynasty of officials and statesmen that served several dynasties of the Middle East until their demise in the early 11th century. His son, al-Husayn continued to serve the Abbasids until he went over to the Ikhshidids and then the Hamdanids; his grandson, Ali, was in Hamdanid and later Fatimid service until his execution along with almost the entire family in 1010; his great-grandson, Abu'l-Qasim al-Husayn, escaped the massacre and served in the Buyid, Marwanid and Uqaylid courts until his death in 1027.

References

Sources
 

10th-century Iranian politicians
10th-century people from the Abbasid Caliphate
Ali
Officials of the Abbasid Caliphate